Judith (or Jutta, sometimes called Julitta or Ita in Latin sources; c. 1115/1120 – after 1168), a member of the House of Babenberg, was Marchioness of Montferrat from 1135 until her death, by her marriage with Marquess William V.

Life
Judith was a daughter of Margrave Leopold III of Austria (1073–1136), from his second marriage with Agnes (1072–1143), the only daughter of the Salian emperor Henry IV. 

During 1133, Judith married the Aleramici marquess William V of Montferrat. The Aleramici were among the leading dynasties in the Crusades; William accompanied his nephew King Louis VII of France on the Second Crusade of 1147.

Marriage and issue
Judith and William had:
William Longsword (d. 1177), Count of Jaffa and Ascalon; father of Baldwin V of Jerusalem.
Conrad of Montferrat (d. 1192), King of Jerusalem
Boniface of Montferrat (d. 1207); his successor to Montferrat and founder of the Kingdom of Thessalonica.
Frederick of Montferrat, Bishop of Alba
Renier of Montferrat (d. 1183); married into the Byzantine imperial family.
The marriage also produced three daughters:
Agnes of Montferrat (1202); married Count Guido Guerra III Guidi of Modigliana. The marriage was annulled on grounds of childlessness before 1180, when Guido remarried, and Agnes entered the convent of Santa Maria di Rocca delle Donne.
Adelasia (Azalaïs) of Montferrat (d. 1232); married Manfred II, Marquess of Saluzzo, c. 1182, and was regent for her grandson, Manfred III.
An unidentified daughter, who married Albert, Marquess of Malaspina.

Judith was still living in 1168, but seems to have died before her husband went to the Kingdom of Jerusalem after their grandson Baldwin's coronation as King of Jerusalem in the 1180s.

Ancestry

References

12th-century births
12th-century deaths
Babenberg
12th-century Italian nobility
12th-century Austrian people
Aleramici
Marchionesses of Montferrat
Austrian people of German descent
Austrian people of French descent
Austrian people of Italian descent
12th-century Austrian women
12th-century Italian women
Daughters of monarchs